Lauzun (Languedocien: Lausun) is a commune in the Lot-et-Garonne department in south-western France. The village of Lauzun is located in the north of Lot et Garonne, in the Nouvelle-Aquitaine region.  It is separated from Périgord (Dordogne) by the river Dropt. It is on the D1 road, between Miramont and Castillonnes.

History
Lauzun's strategic hilltop position was the site of a Gallo-Roman settlement, with a castle developed from the 6th century.

The de Caumont family were the lords of Lauzun from the 12th century until the French Revolution. The title Baron de Lauzun was elevated to become Comte de Lauzon from 1570 and Duc de Lauzun from 1692.

The Chateau de Lauzun was developed from the original medieval fortress as a Renaissance palace, hosting visits from Catherine de Medicis and her son, the future King Charles IX.

The church of St Etienne has a 15th-century Madonna & child sculpture, a 16th-century polychrome statue of Christ and a 17th-century altar and pulpit, commissioned by Nompar de Caumont, Compte de Lauzun, in 1623.

In 1793, Lauzun was made a district centre of the Lot and Garonne department, with a law court and a post office.

Notable residents
 Antonin Nompar de Caumont, Duke of Lauzun (1633–1723), courtier, general, Governor of Berry and husband of Anne of Orleans.
 Armand Louis de Gontaut-Biron, Duke of Lauzun (1747–1793), general in both the US and French revolutions.
 Pierre Boussion (1753–1829), doctor and member of the revolutionary Assemblee Generale.
 François-Peloubet Chabrier (1789–1871), senator and archivist.

Elections 
In the 2007 Presidential elections, Lauzun voted narrowly for Segolene Royal (50.11%) ahead of the eventual victor, Nicolas Sarkozy (49.89%).

In the 2012 Presidential elections, Lauzun voted narrowly for Nicolas Sarkozy (51.94%) ahead of the eventual victor, Francois Hollande (48.06%).

See also
Communes of the Lot-et-Garonne department

References

Communes of Lot-et-Garonne